The 2nd Light Tank Company was an Australian Army armoured unit formed in March 1939 equipped with the Vickers Medium Mark II medium tank.

The unit was based at Caulfield, Victoria.

Citations

Australian armoured units
Military units and formations established in 1939
Military units and formations disestablished in 1941